S. Sripal was an Indian police commissioner who was Director General of Police in Tamil Nadu.

Early life

After graduation in Economics from Loyola College, Chennai, Sripal entered the Indian Police Service in 1960 and rose from the rank of Assistant superintendent of Police to the top-most post of Director General of Police.

Professional career
Sripal was Assistant Superintendent of Police in the towns of Namakkal and Madurai, and Superintendent of Police in North Arcot district and Madurai district. He worked to end gang warfare in Kolli Hills, Kalrayan Hills and Madurai town and was involved in cases such as apprehending wire thieves in Salem district and a gang of murderers responsible for killing taxi drivers. Later, he moved into specialised fields such as CID. He served as Commissioner of Police in Chennai for over five years and was the Chief of Police in Tamil Nadu state between 1991–95.

In recognition of his service, Sripal was awarded the Police medal and the President of India Police Medal.

Sripal participated in the Asian Pacific Conference of Prison Administrators held at Delhi in 1989, where he spoke on “Penal Philosophy", and he represented India in the International Police Organization General Assembly meeting held in Rome in 1994.

Sripal has written two Tamil-language books, titled Chintamani Poonga (Garden of Thoughts) and Painthamizh Poonga (Garden of Sweet Tamil). He has also contributed to periodicals, magazines, All India Radio and Doordarshan. He was the architect of the Research Foundation for Jainology in Tamil Nadu, of which he was the chairman for over a decade from its inception. He had succeeded in creating a full-fledged Department of Jainology in Madras University which also conducts courses through correspondence. He was largely instrumental in publishing under the auspices of this department a book entitled A topographical list of Jain Inscriptions in Tamil Nadu. This book enumerates 530 inscriptions in almost all the districts of Tamil Nadu some of which date back to before the Christian era.

Family
Sripal was married to Kamalie Sripal and with her had two children. Tharun Mohan(the oldest) and Hema Sripal(the youngest). Tharun went on to become the CEO and president of his company, Quantum Strides LLC and married someone. Hema Sripal went on to become a very famous Bharatnatyam dancer well-recognized all through India and many other places. She married Vidyasankar Narayanan from Coimbatore and had two kids, Isha Sankar(the oldest) and Ishvar Shankar(the youngest). Both had moved to Ameriaca in their early 20's.

References

Indian police chiefs
Tamil Nadu Police
1938 births
2014 deaths
20th-century Indian Jains
21st-century Indian Jains